Testing kit or test kit is a discerning device used in a wide range of areas including:
Medical diagnosis
Reagent testing
Rape kit
Pregnancy test
Gunshot residue
Soil test